The 1970 United States Senate election in Florida was held on November 3, 1970. Incumbent Democratic U.S. Senator Spessard Holland decided to retire instead of seeking a fifth term. During the Democratic primary, former Governor C. Farris Bryant and State Senator Lawton Chiles advanced to a run-off, having received more votes than Speaker of the Florida House of Representatives Frederick H. Schultz, attorney Alcee Hastings, and State Representative Joel T. Daves III. Chiles soundly defeated Bryant in the run-off election, scoring a major upset due to his comparatively small name recognition prior to the election.

The Republican primary exposed an in-party feud between Governor Claude R. Kirk Jr. and U.S. Representative William C. Cramer. In the election, Cramer handily defeated G. Harrold Carswell and body shop owner George Balmer; the former was a Fifth Circuit Court of Appeals judge favored by Kirk and had been rejected as a Supreme Court of the United States nominee a few months prior to the primary. Chiles won the election by a relatively small margin of 7.8%, receiving 902,438 votes against Cramer's 772,817 votes.

Background 
Incumbent Spessard Holland, who served in the Senate since 1946, decided to retire rather than seek a fifth term. Although the Democratic Party had dominated state elections since the Reconstruction Era, Claude R. Kirk Jr. and Edward Gurney, both Republicans, were elected Governor and Senator in 1966 and 1968, respectively.

Democratic primary

Candidates 
C. Farris Bryant, former Governor of Florida
Lawton Chiles, State Senator
Joel T. Daves III, State Representative
Alcee Hastings, attorney
Frederick H. Schultz, Speaker of the Florida House of Representatives

Campaign 
Initially, Bryant, a well-known figure, was seen as a natural front-runner. He was challenged by State Senator Lawton Chiles, Speaker of the Florida House of Representatives Frederick H. Schultz, attorney Alcee Hastings, and State Representative Joel T. Daves III.

"Walkin' Lawton" 

Chiles, despite a twelve-year career in legislature, was largely unknown outside his district. A poll indicated that Chiles had a name recognition of only 5%. To generate some media coverage across the state, Chiles embarked upon a  walk across Florida. He would spend each night in a camper, which was driven by one of his aides.

On March 17, Chiles began the walk starting in Century, a small town in Escambia County along the Alabama state line. He initially headed east along State Road 4, toward Tallahassee. Throughout the journey, a number of people walked a small portion of the distance, including State Senators Wilbur H. Boyd – uncle of State House member Jim Boyd – and Bob Saunders. Upon reaching the community of Milligan, Chiles turned onto U.S. Route 90, then the main highway through the Florida Panhandle, toward Crestview. On April 7, he reached Tallahassee and remained there during the Florida Legislative session, which lasted 60 days. Thereafter, he continued on Route 90 for several days, until reaching Lake City, where he began heading along State Road 100 to the city of Lake Butler.

After reaching Starke, Chiles headed south on Route 301 toward Waldo, where he switched to State Road 24 toward Gainesville. There, he met many students, professors, and others in the vicinity of the University of Florida, his alma mater. He next made a side trip to Pasco County, visiting Dade City, New Port Richey, and Zephyrhills. Chiles made another side trip to Volusia County on the east coast, passing through the cities of Daytona Beach, DeLand, and New Smyrna Beach. Thereafter, he went back to Gainesville and walked south on Route 441 to Ocala.

The 91-day walk earned him the recognition he sought, and the nickname that would follow him throughout his political career – "Walkin' Lawton", coined by Associated Press writer John Van Gieson after Chiles passed through the town of Ponce de Leon.

Results

Primary election

Runoff primary election

Republican primary

Candidates 
George Balmer, body shop owner
G. Harrold Carswell, former Judge on the United States Court of Appeals for the Fifth Circuit
Bill Cramer, U.S. Representative

Campaign 
In the fall of 1969, Cramer declared his candidacy for the Senate. President Nixon encouraged Cramer's candidacy in 1970: "Bill, the Senate needs you, the country needs you, the people need you–now run." Sometime during the election, Cramer declined to run for re-election to his U.S. House seat. His former district assistant Charles William "Bill" Young of St. Petersburg, then the Florida Senate minority leader, ran for this seat. Young won and remained in the seat until his death in 2013. In April 1970, the Senate rejected Judge G. Harrold Carswell of Tallahassee as Nixon's second consecutive conservative nominee to the United States Supreme Court. He had been newly appointed to the United States Court of Appeals for the Fifth Circuit, based in New Orleans, but his federal judicial service began under Dwight D. Eisenhower. Senators Gurney and Holland, both Carswell supporters, were dismayed by his rejection. Later that year, Carswell attributed his unsuccessful Supreme Court nomination to the "dark evil winds of liberalism" and the "northern press and its knee-jerking followers in the Senate."

Expecting to benefit over the uproar in Florida over the rejection of Judge Carswell, political aides suggested that Carswell resign from the bench and run for Holland's Senate seat. Carswell agreed and declared his candidacy while accompanying Governor Kirk in front of reporters in Miami on April 20. Initially, Lieutenant Governor Ray C. Osborne was challenging Cramer for the Republican nomination, but dropped out after Carswell entered the race. Years later, Kirk expressed regret for encouraging Carswell to run and Osborne to withdraw. It is possible that Cramer and Gurney came to an agreement in which Gurney would run for Senate in 1968 and allow Cramer to run in 1970. However, Carswell and Gurney denied having any knowledge of the deal. Although Nixon encouraged Cramer to run, he would not voice support for either Carswell or Cramer during the primary contest. Carswell was endorsed by nationally known actors John Wayne and Gene Autry, as well as Governor Kirk and Senator Gurney.

In the primary campaign, Cramer stressed his amendment to the Civil Rights Act of 1964 to prohibit forced busing to achieve racial balance in public schools. He raised questions about Carswell's concurrence in two Fifth Circuit busing edicts. At first, Carswell ignored Cramer's charges; then he spoke out against busing. A reporter from the Miami Herald compared Carswell's speeches to "legal opinions" aimed more at Senators Edward M. Kennedy of Massachusetts and Birch Bayh of Indiana, who had worked against his confirmation, than to Florida Republican primary voters. As a circuit judge, Carswell was bound by high court precedent, and after 1968, the federal courts had decreed busing as a tool to pursue racial balance in schools. Like Cramer, Kirk was identified with anti-busing forces. He had been unable, in 1970, to halt a desegregation plan in Manatee County.At a time of cultural change and social unrest, Cramer went beyond the busing issue in his speeches to attack "cop killers, bombers, burners, and racial revolutionaries who would destroy America."

In the Republican primary held on September 8, 1970, Cramer received 220,553 votes to Carswell's 121,281. A third candidate, businessman George Balmer, polled 10,974 votes. Senate Republican Leader Hugh Scott of Pennsylvania, who opposed Carswell's confirmation to the Supreme Court, said that Carswell "was asking for it, and he got what he deserved." Cramer attributed his Senate nomination to his grassroots support and Carswell's lack of campaign experience. Carswell, however, argued that his support among Democrats would have been considerable had Florida been an open primary state, which both Alabama and Georgia conducted open primaries.

Results

General election

Major candidates 
Lawton Chiles (D), State Senator
Bill Cramer (R), U.S. Representative

Results

See also  
 United States Senate elections, 1970

References

Footnotes

Bibliography  

 

1970
Florida
United States Senate